Priyanka Jawalkar (born 12 November 1992) is an Indian actress and model who primarily works in Telugu films. She made her acting debut with Kala Varam Aaye (2017). She then appeared in Taxiwala (2018) and Thimmarusu (2021). Jawalkar received Filmfare Award for Best Supporting Actress – Telugu nomination for her performance in Gamanam (2021).

Early life and education
Priyanka Jawalkar was born on 12 November 1992 in a Marathi-speaking family in Anantapur, Andhra Pradesh, India. Jawalkar, a computer science graduate, has completed a Diploma in Fashion designing from National Institute of Fashion Technology, Hyderabad. She later moved to the US for an 8-month course in statistics and worked in an MNC company for 6 months.

Career
Jawalkar was approached for films after she had uploaded a few of her photos on social media. She made her acting debut in 2017 Telugu-language film Kala Varam Aaye, opposite Sanjeev SKJ. She then appeared opposite Vijay Devarakonda in the 2018 film Taxiwala. It became a box office success. The Indian Express noted, "Priyanka Jawalkar’s role was to look pretty on screen and she has done it very naturally."

Post a two year hiatus, Jawalkar had three releases in 2021. She first appeared in Thimmarusu, a remake of the Kannada film Birbal Trilogy Case 1: Finding Vajramuni, opposite Satyadev Kancharana . Deccan Chronicle said, "Priyanka Jawalkar gives a decent performance, but her role is weakly penned." She next portrayed a college student in SR Kalyanamandapam opposite Kiran Abbavaram. Times of India mentioned, "Priyanka Jawalkar is good enough in her role, giving her best with what she’s offered." Jawalkar portrayed a muslim girl, Zara in Gamanam, her final release of the year. The New Indian Express noted, "Priyanka  Jawalkar is aptly cast in her roles and delivers an earnest performances."

Jawalkar will next appear alongside Nandamuri Balakrishna in NBK 108.

Filmography

Films

Awards and nominations

References

External links
  
 

Living people
People from Anantapur, Andhra Pradesh
21st-century Indian actresses
Indian female models
Actresses in Telugu cinema
Actresses from Andhra Pradesh
Indian film actresses
Marathi actors
National Institute of Fashion Technology alumni
1992 births